Anthene ukerewensis is a butterfly in the family Lycaenidae. It is found in Tanzania.

References

Butterflies described in 1909
Anthene
Endemic fauna of Tanzania
Butterflies of Africa